General German Protestant Orphans Home, also known as the Pleasant Run Children's Home , is a historic orphanage located in Indianapolis, Indiana.  It was designed by architect Diedrich A. Bohlen (1827–1890) and built in 1871–1872.  It is a -story brick institutional building on a limestone block foundation.  It has eclectic German vernacular detailing and varying roof forms.

It was listed on the National Register of Historic Places in 1984.

References

Orphanages in the United States
Residential buildings on the National Register of Historic Places in Indiana
Buildings and structures completed in 1872
Buildings and structures in Indianapolis
National Register of Historic Places in Indianapolis